Gastón Gaudio was the defending champion, but he chose not to compete due to a foot injury.José Acasuso won in the final 6–3, 6–4 against Daniel Brands.

Seeds

Draw

Finals

Top half

Bottom half

External links
Main Draw
Qualifying Draw

Tunis Open - Singles
2010 Singles